Dub Dá Leithe mac Tomaltach, 28th King of Uí Maine, died 816 .

Dub Dá Leithe mac Tomaltach is one of the two kings of Ui Maine listed in the obits sub anno 816. Dub Dá Leithe is listed as "chief of Ui Maine (?)" in the Annals of Ulster, with apparently a question concerning his rule.

The Annals of the Four Masters, for the same year, mention Cathal mac Murchadh. It may be that one was a short-lived successor to the other.

Notes

References

 Annals of Ulster at CELT: Corpus of Electronic Texts at University College Cork
 Annals of Tigernach at CELT: Corpus of Electronic Texts at University College Cork
Revised edition of McCarthy's synchronisms at Trinity College Dublin.
 Byrne, Francis John (2001), Irish Kings and High-Kings, Dublin: Four Courts Press,

External links
 Commentary by Dan M. Wiley (The Cycles of the Kings Web Project)

People from County Galway
People from County Roscommon
9th-century Irish monarchs
Kings of Uí Maine